Mbayang Sow (born 21 January 1993) is a Senegalese footballer who plays as a defender for US Parcelles Assainies and the Senegal women's national team.

She played for Senegal at the 2012 African Women's Championship. During the match against DR Congo, she was shown a red card for a handball in the penalty area.

References

External links

1993 births
Living people
Senegalese women's footballers
Women's association football defenders
Senegal women's international footballers